Cora rubrosanguinea is a species of basidiolichen in the family Hygrophoraceae. Found in Ecuador, it was formally described as a new species in 2016 by Freddy Nugra, Bibiana Moncada, and Robert Lücking  The specific epithet rubrosanguinea refers to the reddish pigment that exudes from rewetted herbarium material. The lichen is found in the northern Andes of Ecuador, where it grows on the ground or over rocks with bryophytes.

References

rubrosanguinea
Lichen species
Lichens described in 2016
Lichens of Ecuador
Taxa named by Robert Lücking
Basidiolichens